Xinshi Subdistrict is a subdistrict of Lintong District in the northeastern suburbs of Xi'an, located  north-northeast of downtown Lintong. , it has one residential communities and 11 villages under its administration.

References

Township-level divisions of Shaanxi